The third inauguration of Manuel L. Quezon as the second president of the Philippines and the first president of the Philippine Commonwealth under the United States took place on November 15, 1943. The inauguration marked the start of the third and last term of Quezon as President and Sergio Osmeña as Vice President. The oath of office was administered by US Associate Justice Felix Frankfurter.

References 
 

Presidency of Manuel L. Quezon
Philippine presidential inaugurations
1943 in the Philippines